Blossom Time is a 1934 British musical drama film directed by Paul L. Stein and starring Richard Tauber, Jane Baxter and Carl Esmond. It was based on the opera Blossom Time by Heinrich Berté. In nineteenth century Vienna,  composer Franz Schubert assists a girl with whom he is secretly in love. The film had a London midnight premiere on 10 July 1934, a trade/press showing in Nottingham on 25 July, and opened to the public on 24 August at the Regal Cinema, Marble Arch, where it ran for seven weeks. The Vienna premiere was at the 'Apollo' on 20 November 1934.

Cast
 Richard Tauber  as Franz Schubert
 Jane Baxter  as Vicki Wimpassinger
 Carl Esmond  as Count Rudi Von Hohenberg
 Athene Seyler  as Archduchess Maria Victoria
 Paul Graetz  as Alois Wimpassinger
 Charles Carson  as Lafont
 Marguerite Allan  as Baroness
 Edward Chapman  as Mayrhofer
 Lester Matthews  as Schwind
 Gibb McLaughlin  as  Bauernfeld
 Ivan Samson  as Hutten Bremmer
 Frederick Lloyd  as Police Captain
 Cecil Ramage  as Vogl
 Bertha Belmore  as Madame
 Hugh Dempster  as Will
 Spencer Trevor  as Colonel
 Bruce Winston  as Fat Man

Reception
Blossom Time was voted the best British film of 1934 by the readers of Film Weekly.

During the showing on 7 September 1934, Richard Tauber spoke to the audience at the Regal Cinema in London by shortwave from Vienna, where he was appearing in his own operetta 'The Singing Dream'.

See also
 The House of Three Girls (1918)
 Three Girls for Schubert (1936)
 The House of Three Girls (1958)

References

External links
 

1934 films
British historical musical films
British musical drama films
Films shot at British International Pictures Studios
Films directed by Paul L. Stein
1930s historical musical films
Operetta films
Films based on operettas
Films about composers
Films set in the 1820s
Films set in Vienna
British remakes of German films
Sound film remakes of silent films
Films based on Austrian novels
Films based on adaptations
British black-and-white films
Films with screenplays by Franz Schulz
Cultural depictions of Franz Schubert
1930s musical drama films
1934 drama films
1930s English-language films
1930s British films